The men's long jump event  at the 1973 European Athletics Indoor Championships was held on 10 March in Rotterdam.

Results

References

Long jump at the European Athletics Indoor Championships
Long